J.-Eugène Lefrançois (9 August 1896 – 13 January 1979) was a Liberal party member of the House of Commons of Canada and the Senate. He was born in Montreal, Quebec and became an industrialist by career.

In 1936, Lefrançois made an unsuccessful attempt to win a seat in the Legislative Assembly of Quebec.

He was first elected to Parliament at the Laurier riding in the 1949 general election and re-elected for a second term in 1953. In April 1957, as he completed his House of Commons term in the 22nd Canadian Parliament, Lefrançois was appointed to the Senate under Quebec's Repentigny constituency where he remained until 5 November 1976.

Lefrançois died on 13 January 1979 aged 82, survived by his wife Rosina, a son and a daughter.

References

External links 
 

1896 births
1979 deaths
Canadian senators from Quebec
Liberal Party of Canada MPs
Liberal Party of Canada senators
Members of the House of Commons of Canada from Quebec
Politicians from Montreal